Abdulla Al Gurg is the Member of the Board of Directors & Director of Advisory Board  of Easa Saleh Al Gurg Group, consisting of 27 companies. Al Gurg is the third generation of the family, and the grandson of founder Easa Saleh Al Gurg. The Group which has been in business for over six decades.

Early life and education

Al Gurg is the oldest son of Mrs Raja Al Gurg, the managing director of Easa Saleh Al Gurg Group.  He earned his bachelor's degree in marketing and management from the American University of Sharjah, after graduating from the Dubai National School. Al Gurg also holds a master's certificate in management concepts from Regis University, Denver, Colorado.

Career

Al Gurg became Group General Manager of the Easa Saleh Al Gurg Group in October, 2009. Before taking up his present position, Al Gurg served as executive project director of The Tiger Woods Dubai for over three years. His first job was in the sales department of a call centre at Tejari.com, an e-commerce hub in Dubai.

Under his tenure the Easa Saleh Al Gurg Group has expanded in the GCC region; in the Sultanate of Oman, Qatar and the Kingdom of Saudi Arabia. Al Gurg has also led the activation of a Treasury Management System, helping establish the first in-house Bank in the GCC region. He is also an active Board member within the Group’s joint ventures, namely Al Gurg Fosroc LLC, Siemens LLC, Arabian Explosives, Al Gurg Smollan and Al Gurg Unilever. Abdulla is also on the Board of Directors of the National Bank of Fujairah. He is the Chairman of the Advisory Board of the Emirates E-Sports Association and a member of its Executive Office.

Personal life

Abdulla Al Gurg has four children namely Essa, Abdul Aziz, Mahra and Mansoor Abdulla Al Gurg. Al Gurg is a member of the Board of Directors of the Easa Saleh Al Gurg Charity Foundation. In recognition of the Foundation‘s charitable efforts, he was the Lloyds TSB Torchbearer for the London 2012 Olympic Torch Relay.

References

American University of Sharjah alumni
Year of birth missing (living people)
Living people
Emirati businesspeople